Psychosaura is a genus of skinks. Both species are endemic to Brazil.

Species
The following 2 species, listed alphabetically by specific name, are recognized as being valid:

Psychosaura agmosticha (Rodrigues, 2000) 
Psychosaura macrorhyncha (Hoge, 1946) – Hoge's mabuya

Nota bene: A binomial authority in parentheses indicates that the species was originally described in a genus other than Psychosaura.

References

 
Lizard genera
Taxa named by Stephen Blair Hedges
Taxa named by Caitlin E. Conn